A sangar (or sanger) is a temporary fortified position with a breastwork originally constructed of stones, and now built of sandbags, gabions or similar materials. Sangars are normally constructed in terrain where the digging of trenches would not be practicable. The term is still frequently used by the British Army, but has now been extended to cover a wider range of small fortified positions.

Etymology
The word was adopted from Hindi and Pashto and derives originally from the Persian word sang, "stone". Its first appearance in English (as recorded by the Oxford English Dictionary) is in the form sunga, and dates from 1841. The word has also occasionally been used as a verb, meaning "to fortify with a sangar": however, this usage appears to have been limited to the first decade of the 20th century.

Traditional usage
The term was originally used by the British Indian Army to describe small temporary fortified positions on the North West Frontier and in Afghanistan. It was widely used by the British during the Italian Campaign of the Second World War. The term is also used by the British Royal Air Force to describe fortified guard positions on airfields.

Modern usage

More recently, the use of the term has been extended to cover a wider range of small, semi-permanent fortified positions. The Independent Monitoring Commission stated immediately after The Troubles in Northern Ireland:

See also
 List of established military terms

References

External links

 Article on the  dismantling of the Borucki Sangar at Crossmaglen in south Armagh.

. A description and photographs of British Army Sangars.

Fortification (architectural elements)
Fortifications by type